The 2009–10 Arizona State Sun Devils men's basketball team represented Arizona State University during the 2009–10 NCAA Division I men's basketball season. The head coach was Herb Sendek. The Sun Devils played their home games at the Wells Fargo Arena and are members of the Pacific-10 Conference. The Sun Devils finished with 22–11, 12–6 in Pac-10 play and lost in the quarterfinals of the 2010 Pacific-10 Conference men's basketball tournament to Stanford. They earn to the trip to the 2010 National Invitation Tournament which they lost to Jacksonville in the first round.

Departures
The Sun Devils lost James Harden and Jeff Pendergraph they were both averaging over 10 points per game.

Roster

Schedule

|-
!colspan=9| Regular Season

|-
!colspan=9| 2010 Pacific-10 Conference men's basketball tournament

|-
!colspan=9| NIT

References

Arizona State Sun Devils men's basketball seasons
Arizona State Sun Devils
Arizona State
Arizonia
Arizonia